Andrei Mureșanu National College may refer to one of two educational institutions in Romania:

Andrei Mureșanu National College (Bistrița)
Andrei Mureșanu National College (Dej)

There is also an Andrei Mureșanu High School in Brașov.